Cytochrome c oxidase subunit 6C is an enzyme that in humans is encoded by the COX6C gene.

Cytochrome c oxidase (COX), the terminal enzyme of the mitochondrial respiratory chain, catalyzes the electron transfer from reduced cytochrome c to oxygen. It is a heteromeric complex consisting of 3 catalytic subunits encoded by mitochondrial genes and multiple structural subunits encoded by nuclear genes. The mitochondrially-encoded subunits function in electron transfer, and the nuclear-encoded subunits may be involved in the regulation and assembly of the complex. This nuclear gene encodes subunit VIc, which has 77% amino acid sequence identity with mouse COX subunit VIc. This gene is up-regulated in prostate cancer cells. A pseudogene COX6CP1 has been found on chromosomes 16p12.

References

External links

Further reading

Oncogenes